Pseudocalliurichthys variegatus, the variegated ruddertail dragonet , is a species of dragonet native to the western Pacific off southern Japan where it can be found in beds of Zostera sea grass, on sandy sea beds and among reef rubble.  This species grows to a length of  SL.  This species is the only known member of its genus.

References

Callionymidae
Fish described in 1845